Brothers in Arms: D-Day is a first-person shooter video game in the Brothers in Arms series for the PlayStation Portable. It uses the Unreal Engine 2.0 as its technology base. Though  labeled as a spin-off, the game's plot is actually a crossover/compilation of Brothers in Arms: Road to Hill 30 and Brothers in Arms: Earned in Blood from the main series.

Gameplay
Brothers in Arms: D-Day takes the player through the Normandy campaign and like its predecessors follows Sgt. Matthew Baker and Cpl. (later Sgt.) Joe Hartstock through actual missions that took place in Normandy during June 1944 from the June 6th airborne invasion to St Sauveur-le-Vicomte. Also like Brothers in Arms: Road to Hill 30 and Brothers in Arms: Earned in Blood it gives the chance for the player to take control of a squad allowing the player to issue orders and decide the best way to assault the enemy. BIA: D-Day also offers a wide range of both German and American authentic World War II weapons.

Much like the first two Brothers in Arms games, D-Day heavily focuses on commanding a squad to suppress then flank an enemy force with head-on assaults usually resulting in disaster. The game additionally uses intelligent opponents who will try to outmaneuver the player, although the AI in D-Day is not as advanced as the earlier PC/console versions of the game.

Reception

Brothers in Arms: D-Day received "mixed or average" reviews, according to review aggregator Metacritic.

References

External links
Brothers in Arms: D-Day official website

2006 video games
Brothers in Arms (video game series)
First-person shooters
Gearbox Software games
Multiplayer and single-player video games
PlayStation Portable games
PlayStation Portable-only games
Ubisoft games
Unreal Engine games
Video games developed in China
Video games developed in the United States
Video games set in France